William C. Rhodes, III is a sculptural furniture designer who studied at the Baltimore School for the Arts.  He then earned a BA in Furniture Building and Design from the University of the Arts in Philadelphia and a Master's of Fine Arts from the University of Massachusetts Dartmouth.  Collections of various galleries and museums show Rhodes' work and they are featured in several major publications.

Rhodes’ travels to Africa, Asia and Central and South America strongly influences his work.  The people, art and cultures of these societies led to Rhodes using non-Western approaches to furniture and art to create utilitarian objects that are works of art. Additionally, Rhodes’ uses his studies of karmic astrology and astrocartography to create artwork that promotes healing.

William Rhodes believes the spirit and characteristics of materials lend themselves to a particular piece of art. Recycled materials are an important component of his work.

Rhodes has been featured in multiple shows, including "Stop Asking," curated by internationally known fiber performance artist Joyce Scott.  This show represented the work of 25 innovative nationally recognized artists. Having exhibited his designs nationally, Rhodes has established himself as a "creative, against-the-grain" sculptor.

The St. Paul Art and Design Gallery is owned by Rhodes. The gallery was started in 2000 to serve as a venue for showcasing the art of community-based artists who were overlooked by mainstream galleries.  Additionally, the gallery has hosted events, such as yoga and mediation programs as well as art and music shows.

References 

American sculptors
Living people
Year of birth missing (living people)